The Institute for the Study of Academic Racism (ISAR) is an organization that monitors "changing intellectual trends in academic racism, biological determinism, and eugenics." ISAR states that in this capacity it "acts as a resource service for students, academics, journalists, legislators and civil rights activists." ISAR was founded by Barry Mehler in 1993. The institute maintains an online presence housed by, but independent from, Ferris State University.

Criticism 
Proponents of eugenics such as the late Glayde Whitney accused Mehler of using what they perceive as "inquisition-like" tactics in order to discredit controversial scientists such as Raymond Cattell and Richard Lynn on what they considered to be nonscientific grounds. Whitney stated that Mehler combats those he accuses of racism primarily through popular rather than scientific channels (for example TV programs, such as Geraldo).

References

Further reading

External links 
 Institute for the Study of Academic Racism - Archived February 17, 2017

Racism
Race and intelligence controversy
Non-profit organizations based in the United States